The Pearls of Doctor Talmadge (German:Die Perlen des Dr. Talmadge) is a 1925 German silent mystery film directed by Max Obal and starring Ernst Reicher and Alexandra Sorina. It was one of a series of films featuring the detective Stuart Webbs.

It was made at the Emelka Studios in Munich.

Cast
 Ernst Reicher as Stuart Webbs, Detektiv  
 Alexandra Sorina 
 Hermann Pfanz
 Fritz Greiner 
 Claire Kronburger 
 John Mylong

References

Bibliography
 Rainey, Buck. Serials and Series: A World Filmography, 1912-1956. McFarland, 2015.

External links

1925 films
Films of the Weimar Republic
Films directed by Max Obal
German silent feature films
German mystery films
German black-and-white films
1925 mystery films
Bavaria Film films
Films shot at Bavaria Studios
Silent mystery films
1920s German films